is a Grand Prix motorcycle racer from Japan.

Career statistics

By season

Races by year

References

External links
  Profile on motogp.com

Japanese motorcycle racers
Living people
1970 births
250cc World Championship riders